Chae Jung-an (born Jang Jung-an on October 21, 1977) is a South Korean actress and singer.

Philanthropy 
On March 11, 2022, Chae made a donation.  millions to the Hope Bridge Disaster Relief Association to help the victims of the massive wildfire that started in Uljin, Gyeongbuk and has spread to Samcheok, Gangwon.

In May 2022, Chae donated 60 million won to the Green Umbrella Children's Foundation with 'Genetic', a beauty brand specializing in aesthetics.

Filmography

Television series

Web series

Films

Television shows

Discography

Awards and nominations

References

External links

 

1977 births
Living people
People from Busan
South Korean television actresses
South Korean film actresses
South Korean women pop singers
K-pop singers
South Korean female idols
South Korean female models
Dongguk University alumni
21st-century South Korean singers
21st-century South Korean women singers